Problepsis meroearia is a moth of the  family Geometridae. It is found on Madagascar and Mayotte.

Subspecies
Problepsis meroearia meroearia (Madagascar)
Problepsis meroearia mayottaria (Oberthür, 1923) (Mayotte)

References

Moths described in 1884
Scopulini
Moths of Africa